Shaea Muhssin is a Yemeni diplomat. He quit his position as Ambassador to Jordan over the 2011 Yemeni uprising.

References

Yemeni diplomats
Ambassadors of Yemen to Jordan
Living people
Year of birth missing (living people)
Place of birth missing (living people)
21st-century Yemeni people